The Gatton Student Center is a student activity center for meetings, conferences, meals, recreation, and shopping for students on the University of Kentucky campus in Lexington, Kentucky. The building houses University of Kentucky's student service offices, as well as many dining and recreational facilities. The original building was constructed in 1938 and remodeled in 2018.

History 
Before being renamed to "Gatton Student Center" in 2018, the original University of Kentucky's student center was completed in 1938; with renovation additions happening in 1963 and 1982. Beginning in 2014, the University of Kentucky Student Center would undergo a series of remodels and expansions resulting in the Gatton Student Center, a US$200 million, 330,000 square foot building. Construction of the Gatton Student Center was finalized in 2018, two years after its projected grand opening in 2016.   The original 1938 ballroom and Great Hall, which feature  wrought-iron rails and decorations made by UK engineering students in the campus forge, are being preserved.  They were designed by Architect Ernst Johnson; many other buildings designed by Johnson for the University have since been torn down and replaced.

The most recent renovation to the building, beginning in 2014, The Gatton Student Center was designed by Omni Architects company and Perkins + Will. Foodservice design was provided by Tipton Associates, APAC.

Naming of building 

The Gatton Student Center is named after Bill Gatton, an American businessman who is an alumnus of the University of Kentucky. Gatton donated $20,000,000 to fund the project, hence why the building was named in his honor.

Facilities

Dining

Dining hall 
Champions Kitchen is located on the first floor of the Gatton Student Center, which serves as a dining hall for students to purchase meals. Champion's Kitchen offers a 750-seat dining room with multiple entree options for students to choose from. Champions Kitchen is one of two dining halls offered on campus; it serves those who live on the North side of the University of Kentucky.

Restaurant chains 

 Chick-fil-A
 Auntie Anne's
 Panda Express
 Subway (restaurant)
 Starbucks

Recreational

Alumni Gym 
Originally serving as the University of Kentuckys basketball court from 1924 to 1950, the Alumni Gym Fitness Center is now serving as a gym for students and faculty to use while on campus. The original building was remodeled in 1937, as well as 1982. Alumni Gym Fitness Center features over 200 pieces of exercise equipment. The Alumni Gym Fitness Center serves as one of the two fitness centers located on campus; it is located on the North side of the University of Kentucky's campus.

Cats Den 
The Cats Den, located on the first floor of the Gatton Student Center, is a designated area for students to socialize with one another. Open karaoke nights are offered on weekday nights. The space is often used during the day by students as a quiet area to do homework, study, or eat lunch away from the main areas of the building.

Retail

Barnes & Noble Book Store 
The Gatton Student Center is home to the University of Kentucky Bookstore, a 30,000 sq. ft location where purchases of books and University of Kentucky apparel can be made. There is also an Apple Inc. store located inside of the building. The Barnes & Noble bookstore is located on the second floor, where other novelty books can be purchased. The Barnes and Noble bookstore is functional and convenient for students to purchase books needed for classes at the University of Kentucky, as professors and teachers are able to directly submit to the bookstore the materials needed for his/her/their courses.

Apple Store 
The Apple Inc. Store, located on the third floor of the Gatton Student Center, offers Apple technology to students at the Education discounted price. However, Only students and staff at the University of Kentucky are able to make purchases and must show a valid University of Kentucky ID.

University of Kentucky Bookstore 
The Official University of Kentucky Bookstore makes its home in the Gatton Student Center offering official Wildcat gear, apparel, and gifts available to students and visitors of the University.

Student organizations 
The following University of Kentucky student organization offices can be found located inside of the Gatton Student Center:

 Student Activities Board
 Student Government Association
 Center for Community Outreach
 DanceBlue 
 Radio station WRFL 
 Office of LGBTQ* Resources
 Martin Luther King Center

References

External links 
 

University of Kentucky
1938 establishments in Kentucky